Bayerisch Eisenstein, until 1951 just Eisenstein is a village and a municipality in the Regen district, in Bavaria, Germany.

Geography
Bayerisch Eisenstein is part of Bayerischer Wald and borders the first German national park established in 1968. The town is both winter and summer resort. In the summer  walking in the forest and mountains is popular. In winter, winter sports prevail concentrating on the Großer Arber mountain.

It is one of a trio of connected places in the area. The other two are Železná Ruda ( or Markt Eisenstein) and Špičák, both in Czech Republic. Železná Ruda lies 2 kilometres northeast from Bayerisch Eisenstein. The town's railway station is split by the border. In August 2006 Bayerisch Eisenstein and Železná Ruda signed a twinning agreement

Transport
Today, trains runs to both halves of the station from the respective countries. The local German train service, the Waldbahn, also continues across the border to Špičák in the Czech Republic.

Bayerisch Eisenstein lies on the Bavarian Forest railway from Plattling to Plzeň.

References

External links
  

Regen (district)
Czech Republic–Germany border crossings